The rivalry between the German federal states of Bavaria and Baden-Württemberg, the nation's second- and third-most populous states behind North Rhine-Westphalia, respectively, is a rhetorical rivalry especially regarding their economies and culture.

Bavaria is typically considered to be a very proud state, known for its "Mia-san-mia" (Bavarian for Wir sind wir; English: We are who we are) motto, which would represent their confident mentality and attitude, while Baden-Württemberg is usually portrayed as a rather modest state. While Baden-Württemberg is generally considered to be more progressive, Bavaria is rather traditional and conservative.

Culture 

Overall, Bavaria is more culturally popular and influential than Baden-Württemberg. Its culture has become synonymous with Germany in the eyes of many people around the world, and Bavarian traditions and festivals, such as the Oktoberfest, are celebrated worldwide. A popular festival of Baden-Württemberg, although not nearly as popular as the Oktoberfest, is the Cannstatter Volksfest.

Bavaria is popular for its football club FC Bayern München, whereas Baden-Württemberg is known for the VfB Stuttgart.

Bavaria is famous for its beer gardens and Bavarian cuisine, which includes traditional food such as schnitzel, sausages, and pretzels. In Baden-Württemberg, the Swabian cuisine is widespread, which is known for dishes such as maultaschen and spätzle.

The state capital cities of Munich and Stuttgart are also their most populous cities and are both vibrant cities in Germany, with each having a significant amount of city culture. Munich has a thriving theater and opera scene, and is home to numerous art galleries and museums, such as the Pinakothek der Moderne and the Deutsches Museum, the world's largest museum of science and technology. Stuttgart is also home to several cultural institutions, such as the Staatsgalerie Stuttgart and the Stuttgart Ballet.

Economy 

Bavaria is home to a number of major global companies, including Siemens, Adidas, and Allianz. The state has Germany's lowest unemployment rate, third highest exports, second highest imports, second highest total research and development expenditure, and third-largest GDP per capita.

Baden-Württemberg is also home to many large and popular companies, such as Bosch, Schwarz Gruppe and SAP. The state has the highest exports (2019) and third-highest imports (2020), as well as the second-lowest unemployment rate and fourth-largest GDP per capita of any German state.

Baden-Württemberg has 277 world market leading companies compared to Bavaria's 211, as well as 14,813 patent registrations versus Bavaria's 12,969, making it the German state with the most patents pending per capita (2020). It also has the second-highest absolute and highest relative number of companies considered "hidden champions", and the highest absolute and relative research and development expenditure (2017) of all German states.

Both Bavaria and Baden-Württemberg have a highly developed automotive industry, with Bavaria housing the headquarters of BMW and Audi and Baden-Württemberg having Mercedes-Benz and Porsche. However, Baden-Württemberg has a slightly larger automotive industry; Despite having a lower population, Baden-Württemberg has more workers employed in the automotive industry (240,000 vs 180,000). Stuttgart, Baden-Württemberg's capital and most populous city, is often called Germany's "Autohauptstadt" ("car capital city"). It is also home to famous automobile museums like the Mercedes-Benz Museum and Porsche Museum, as well as numerous auto-enthusiast magazines.

See also 

 California–Texas rivalry
 Rivalry between Cologne and Düsseldorf

References 

Regional rivalries
Germany
Baden-Württemberg
Bavaria